Anjali Nimbalkar is a senior leader and spokesperson of the Indian National Congress. She represents Khanapur of Belgaum district at the Karnataka Legislative Assembly since 2018.

She holds MBBS degree with masters in Gynaecology and Laparoscopy. She is one of the ten doctors elected to make it to the Karnataka Legislative Assembly.

Personal life
Anjali Nimbalkar was born on 22 August 1976 into a Hindu Maratha family in Khanapur, Belagavi district of Karnataka. She is married to Hemant Nimbalkar (IPS).

Political career
Nimbalkar contested elections from Khanapur of Belagum districts in 2018 and won against Vithal Halagekar (BJP).

She protested salary hike under The Karnataka Ministers Salaries and Allowances (Amendment) Bill, 2022 by the Government of Karnataka and requested government to spend same money to give better facilities to the citizens. She organized padyatra to highlight issues of poor and neglected communities from her constituency.

References

Indian National Congress (Organisation) politicians
Karnataka MLAs 2018–2023
1976 births
Living people